Hatkar, also known as Bargi Dhangar is one of the sub-caste of the Dhangars found in Deccan region of India. Their home language is Marathi. However, Bargi  is a distinct sub-caste from Hatkar Dhangar.

History

Etymology
Shamba Joshi traced the origin of the name to the word "Hatakara", meaning cattle herder and a synonym of Dhangar. He traced the ancestry of Hatkars (Hattikaras) to the "Patti-Jana" people who were settled to the south of Narmada river in the Middle Ages. He also traced the etymology of the word "Maratha" to "Mara-hatta", and theorized that the region was originally known as "Hatta-desa".

Medieval Era
The Ain-i-Akbari describes Hatkars as being "a proud, refractory and domineering race of Rajputs, living in the Basim Sircar and, with numerous armed forces, occupying the forts and controlling the surrounding districts". Furthermore, It mentions a Hatkar force of 1,000 cavalry and 5,000 infantry.

Hatkars were in the army of Shivaji in large numbers and were known for their bravery in the Maratha Empire. "Naik" and "Rao" were the titles given to them.

Syed Siraj-ul-Hassan describes them as "strong built and vigorous frame, generally of dark complexion, with a bold and haughty demeanour and are the stuff of which good soldiers are made". Moreover, They show a marked difference from Maratha Kunbis.

The Hatkar Rebellion of 1819
Under the leadership of Novsaji Naik, the community of Hatkars had captured a number of strongholds in Nanded and Berar, which was under the Nizam of Hyderabad. They were a dread to the Nizam – they started a rebellion which was going on for 20 years. After the Third Anglo-Maratha war, Nizam called on British Indian Army to retake the possessions. Novsaji put up a strong resistance with the assistance of 500 Arab soldiers and a siege ensued. The Siege of Nowah continued for 23 days before it was put down. British force consisted of 3782 soldiers and 252 artillery. The siege was of such considerable significance that the word Nowah was displayed on the badges of the regiments which participated in the siege.

Social standing
According to Hassan, In point of social standing the Hatkars rank with the  Kunbis, with whom they exchange kachi (uncooked) food. The Hatkar males and females dress and decorate themselves like the  Kunbis.  The marriage ceremony of the Hatkars differs little from that in vogue among the  Kunbis. Deshastha Brahmins are employed as priests in religious and ceremonial observances. Kulis of Hatkars are formed after the model common among the Maratha castes.

Primary occupation of Hatkars is farming. In the past, the Hatkars were cultivators and held land-tenures of different grades. They were patil and Deshmukh, Shepherd or occupancy and non-occupancy raiyats and landless day-labourers.

Culture

There is an expression, "Dhangar's ram and Hatkar's flag". Meaning, the one who tends to ram and sheep is Dhangar, while one with a flag is Hatkar. The flag is sparrow tailed and is bi-coloured. The upper-half is yellow, and the second half is red. The favorite object of worship is Khandoba, to whom offerings of flowers and sweetmeats are made every Sunday. In addition to this, they also pay homage to Biroba. They observe all the Hindu festivals, among which the Holi, or Shimga, in March and the Dussehra in October, are held in great importance.

Traditionally, the Hatkars are distinguished from other Dhangar by wearing a red turban, earring and a coarse blanket and carrying staff. Their women wear a considerable number of rings, necklaces, nose rings and ankle bangles.

References

Bibliography 

 
 
 
 
 

 

 
 
 

 
Social groups of Maharashtra
Social groups of Madhya Pradesh
Indian castes

Dhangar